Video de familia is an independent Cuban film made in 2001. It tells the story of a broken Cuban family with a homosexual son which has emigrated to the US. The film is composed of 5 shots of 10 minutes each, in the form of Video Letters. The film has won a number of awards in Cuba.

Mise en Scene
Shot with a VHS camcorder in 5 long un-interrupted hand-held takes, the film consists of several video letters the Cuban family records for his exiled son.

Awards
 Grand Prize for fictional work, 14° Encuentro Nacional de Video, La Habana, Cuba.
 FIPRESCI award, Festival Cineplaza 2001, La Habana, Cuba.
 Best Screenplay Festival Cineplaza 2001, La Habana, Cuba.
 Best Director, Festival Cineplaza 2001, La Habana, Cuba.
 Best Film, Festival Cineplaza 2001, La Habana, Cuba.
 Best Actor, Festival Cineplaza 2001, La Habana, Cuba.
 Best Actress, Festival Cineplaza 2001, La Habana, Cuba.
 Best Director, Festival Caracol de la UNEAC. La Habana Cuba
 Grand Prize, Festival IMAGO, La Habana, Cuba
 Coral for Berst Short Film corto de ficción, 23rd Festival Internacional del Nuevo Cine Latinoamericano.
 Mégano Award from the National Federation of Cine Clubs at the 23rd Festival Internacional del Nuevo Cine Latinoamericano.
 Special Awards from OCIC en el 23rd Festival Internacional del Nuevo Cine Latinoamericano.

External links

  Film Description at ICAIC's (Cuban Film Industry) Official Website in spanish
 

Cuban drama films
2001 films
2000s Spanish-language films
Featurettes
Cuban LGBT-related films
LGBT-related drama films
2001 LGBT-related films